Lyudmila Iosifovna Pinayeva (née Khvedosyuk on 14 January 1936) is a retired Soviet sprint canoeist. She competed at the 1964, 1968 and 1972 Olympics and won four medals, with three golds and one bronze. She also won ten medals at the world championships with seven golds (K-1 500 m: 1966, 1970, 1971; K-4 500 m: 1963, 1966, 1971, 1973) and three silvers (K-1 500 m: 1963, K-2 500 m: 1963, 1973).

References

External links
 
 

1936 births
Living people
Canoeists at the 1964 Summer Olympics
Canoeists at the 1968 Summer Olympics
Canoeists at the 1972 Summer Olympics
Olympic canoeists of the Soviet Union
Olympic gold medalists for the Soviet Union
Olympic bronze medalists for the Soviet Union
Soviet female canoeists
Olympic medalists in canoeing
Russian female canoeists
ICF Canoe Sprint World Championships medalists in kayak
Medalists at the 1972 Summer Olympics
Medalists at the 1968 Summer Olympics
Medalists at the 1964 Summer Olympics